Catocala antinympha, the sweetfern underwing, is a moth of the family Erebidae. It is found from Quebec and Ontario east to Nova Scotia and south to Connecticut, Rhode Island, New York, Massachusetts, Pennsylvania and Maryland.

The wingspan is 45–55 mm. Adults are on wing from July to September. There is one generation per year.

The larvae feed on Comptonia peregrina.

References

External links
Species info

antinympha
Moths of North America
Moths described in 1823